Jack Robert Howell (born August 18, 1961) is an American former professional baseball third baseman.  He made his Major League Baseball (MLB) debut on May 20, 1985, with the California Angels, and played his final game on July 17, 1999, with the Houston Astros.

Early life
Howell was born and raised in Tucson, Arizona. He attended Pima Community College and then the University of Arizona, where he played baseball for the Arizona Wildcats.

Career
Howell played for three different MLB teams during his professional career. He started with the California Angels where he from 1987 to 1989 averaged hitting 20 home runs per season until being traded to the  San Diego Padres.

Howell next played Nippon Professional Baseball (NPB), and was a member of the Yakult Swallows (1992–1994), as well as the  Yomiuri Giants (1995). He won the Central League Most Valuable Player award in 1992, when he led the league in home runs and batting average. On July 29, 1993, Howell hit for the cycle for the Swallows.

He returned to MLB as a bench player with the California Angels during the 1996 Season. He then signed on as a free agent with the Houston Astros, with whom he ended his career in 1999

Howell was the hitting coach for the Arizona Diamondbacks. He was fired by the Diamondbacks following the 2010 season. Howell was the Manager for the Burlington Bees of the Midwest League and Single-A affiliate of the Anaheim Angels until they lost their affiliation in December 2020

References

External links

1961 births
Living people
American expatriate baseball players in Canada
American expatriate baseball players in Japan
Anaheim Angels players
Arizona Diamondbacks coaches
Arizona Wildcats baseball players
Baseball players from Tucson, Arizona
California Angels players
Edmonton Trappers players
Major League Baseball hitting coaches
Major League Baseball third basemen
Nippon Professional Baseball MVP Award winners
San Diego Padres players
Yakult Swallows players
Yomiuri Giants players
Jackson Generals (Texas League) players
Lake Elsinore Storm players
Mat-Su Miners players
Redwood Pioneers players
Salem Angels players